George James may refer to:

 George James (soldier) (1760–1811), colonel of the Royal Northumberland Fusiliers
 George James (footballer) (1899–1976), English footballer
 George James (musician) (1906–1995), American jazz saxophonist
 George James (physician) (1915–1972), American physician and administrator
 George James Jr. (1927–2008), American football coach
 George G. M. James (1893–1956), Guyanese writer
 George C. James (born 1960), American lawyer and judge
 George K. James (1904–1994), American football head coach at Cornell University 
 George Payne Rainsford James (1799–1860), novelist and historical writer
 George Wharton James (1858–1923), prolific popular lecturer and journalist

See also
 George & James, a 1984 album by The Residents
 James George (disambiguation)